Agaritine is an aromatic hydrazine-derivative mycotoxin in mushroom species of the genus Agaricus. It is an α-aminoacid and a derivative of phenylhydrazine.

Occurrence
Agaritine is present as a natural phytochemical in fresh samples of at least 24 species of the genera Agaricus, Leucoagaricus, and Macrolepiota. Mushrooms of these species are found around the world. These mushrooms grow in a wide range of habitats; indeed, one species alone, Agaricus bisporus, is cultivated in over 70 countries and on every continent except Antarctica. A. bisporus, also known as the common button mushroom, is of particular socio-economic importance in developed countries.

Agaritine content varies between individual mushrooms and across species. Agaritine content (% fresh weight) in raw Agaricus bisporus, for example, ranges from 0.033% to 0.173%, with an average of 0.088%. The highest amount of agaritine is found in the cap and gills of the fruiting body, and the lowest in the stem. Agaritine oxidizes rapidly upon storage, however, and is totally degraded after 48 hours in aqueous solution with exposure to extraction with water or methanol and isolation from the extract by one of several methods. It has also been shown to decompose readily upon cooking (up to 90% reduction) as well as upon freezing (up to 75% reduction).

Toxicology

Studies of the potential toxicity of agaritine in humans are absent. In high amounts, it is used experimentally as a carcinogen. Agaritine is broken down by enzymes in animal kidneys into the toxic metabolites 4-(hydroxymethyl)phenylhydrazine and 4-(hydroxymethyl)benzenediazonium ions.

Biosynthesis

Agaritine is synthesized in the vegetative mycelium and then translocated into the fruiting body.

Industry
Extraction of agaritine from mushroom waste is conducted with water or methanol, and isolation from the extract is conducted by various methods. Total industrial syntheses of agaritine have been completed, with an 83% yield, and the overall yield of 33%.

See also 
Agaritine gamma-glutamyltransferase
Genotoxicity
Gyromitrin
Monomethylhydrazine

References 

Mycotoxins
Hydrazides
Primary alcohols
Amino acid derivatives